Hamodia ( – "the Informer") is a Hebrew-language daily newspaper published in Jerusalem. A daily English-language edition is also published in the United States, and weekly English-language editions in England and Israel. A weekly edition for French-speaking readers debuted in 2008. The newspaper's slogan is "The Newspaper of Torah Jewry". It comes with two magazines, Inyan and Prime. Haaretz, the newspaper of Israel's secular left, describes Hamodia as one of the "most powerful" newspapers in the Haredi community.

History
Hamodia was founded in 1950 by Rabbi Yehuda Leib Levin, son of the Agudat Israel leader Rabbi Yitzhak-Meir Levin of Warsaw and Jerusalem.

Its current director general is Rabbi Chaim Moshe Knopf, and its deputy director general is Knopf's son, Rabbi Elazar Knopf.

English-language edition
The English-language edition of Hamodia is published by Levin's daughter, Ruth Lichtenstein. It was first printed on February 27, 1998, as a weekly paper, and on December 15, 2003, it expanded to include a daily publication as well. The daily edition is published from Monday to Friday, with no edition appearing on Saturday (the Jewish Sabbath), Sunday, or the week of Passover, or the week of Sukkot. The weekly edition is printed on Wednesdays, and includes expanded sections and two glossy magazines: Inyan and Prime. The English-language Hamodia is published in four editions: United States (daily and weekly), Israel (weekly only), Australia (weekly only), and Britain (weekly only). The daily edition of the American Hamodia is also available in a digital online edition, which is updated throughout the day. The American version is the first Haredi Jewish daily newspaper ever published in English in the U.S.. The newspaper has a website plus print circulation of 160,000.

Editorial policy
Its editorial policy reflects the Haredi point of view. Although not Zionist, on ideological grounds, it is right of center in its Israeli coverage. It is very vociferous on the thorny issue of Jerusalem, and opposes even minimal concessions. It includes editorials on all sides of American political and economic issues.

The publication prohibits photographs of women on its pages and website. It avoids sensationalism and reveling in tragedies. As Haredi culture shuns television, internet usage, and the reading of secular newspapers, Hamodia is one of the few news sources available to many of its readers. At first, the publishers refused to produce an internet edition of Hamodia, but it now exists.

Notable journalists and writers
Rabbi Dovid Kaplan, chinuch (Jewish education) columnist 
 Rabbi Issamar Ginzberg
 Rebbetzin Tziporah Heller, columnist
 Rabbi Dr. Abraham J. Twerski

See also
List of Israeli newspapers
Binah magazine

References

External links
Official website
Official UK website

1950 establishments in Israel
Daily newspapers published in Israel
Daily newspapers published in the United States
English-language newspapers published in Asia
Haredi Judaism in the United Kingdom
Haredi newspapers
Hebrew-language newspapers
Jewish newspapers published in the United Kingdom
Jewish newspapers published in the United States
Mass media in Jerusalem
Publications established in 1950
Religious mass media in Israel
Weekly newspapers published in the United Kingdom